Leninsky (masculine), Leninskaya (feminine), or Leninskoye (neuter) is the name of several inhabited localities in Russia.

Urban localities
Leninsky, Sakha Republic, a settlement in Aldansky District of the Sakha Republic
Leninskoye, Kirov Oblast, an urban-type settlement in Shabalinsky District of Kirov Oblast

Rural localities
Leninsky, Altai Krai, a settlement in Troitsky District of Altai Krai
Leninsky, Tula Oblast, a settlement in Barsukovsky Rural Okrug of Leninsky District of Tula Oblast
Leninsky, several other rural localities
Leninskoye, Altai Krai, a selo in Smolensky District of Altai Krai
Leninskoye, Jewish Autonomous Oblast, a selo in Leninsky District of the Jewish Autonomous Oblast
Leninskoye, several other rural localities

See also
 Leninsk (disambiguation)
 List of places named after Vladimir Lenin